The 2019 NCAA Division II baseball tournament decided the champion of baseball at the NCAA Division II level for the 2019 season. the  won their eighth national championship in program history by defeating the , who were playing in their second national championship. Head Coach Joe Urso won his fifth national championship in his tenure at Tampa. This tournament also introduced a super regional round to the tournament as the eight regionals were instead split into sixteen. Following which, the regional champions would face off in a best-of-three super regional, the winners of the super regionals would then advance to the College World Series.

Regionals

Atlantic Region

Millersville Regional
Hosted by Millersville at Bennett J. Cooper Park

Regional Champion:

West Chester Regional
Hosted by West Chester at Serpico Stadium

Regional Champion

Atlantic Super Regional
Hosted by Mercyhurst at Mercyhurst Baseball Field

Central Region
Super Regional hosted by Augustana at Ronken Field

East Region
Super Regional Hosted by Southern New Hampshire at Penmen Field

Midwest Region
Super Regional Hosted by Ashland at Donges Field

South Region
Super Regional hosted by Tampa at University of Tampa Baseball Field

Southeast Region

Tigerville Regional
Hosted by North Greenville at Ashmore Park

Regional Champion:

Newberry Regional
Hosted by Newberry College at Smith Road Complex

Regional Champion

Super Regional
Hosted by North Greenville at Ashmore Park

South Central Region

Grand Junction Regional
Hosted by Colorado Mesa at Suplizio Field

Regional Champion:

San Angelo Regional
Hosted by Angelo State at Foster Field

Regional Champion

Super Regional
Hosted by Angelo State at Foster Field

West Region

Azusa Regional
Hosted by Azusa Pacific at Cougar Baseball Field

Regional Champion:

San Diego Regional
Hosted by UC San Diego at Triton Ballpark

Regional Champion

Super Regional
Hosted by Azusa Pacific at Cougar Baseball Field

College World Series

Participants

Results

Bracket

Game results

References

 
NCAA Division II Baseball Tournament
NCAA Division II baseball tournament